Balázs Ladányi (born 6 January 1976) is a Hungarian former professional ice hockey left winger.

Ladányi played for Dunaújvárosi Acélbikák, Újpesti TE, Diables Rouges de Briançon, Alba Volán Székesfehérvár, HC Bolzano and Debreceni Hoki Klub. He also played for the Hungary national team and played in the 2009 IIHF World Championship.

Career statistics

Austrian Hockey League

References

External links

1976 births
Living people
Fehérvár AV19 players
Bolzano HC players
Dunaújvárosi Acélbikák players
Hungarian ice hockey left wingers
Diables Rouges de Briançon players
Sportspeople from Dunaújváros
Újpesti TE (ice hockey) players